David Allen Burba (born July 7, 1966) is an American former professional baseball pitcher who played for the Seattle Mariners, San Francisco Giants, Cincinnati Reds, Cleveland Indians, Texas Rangers, and Milwaukee Brewers of Major League Baseball (MLB) from 1990 to 2004. In his 15-year MLB career, Burba's record was 115–87, with 1,398 strikeouts, and a 4.49 ERA. He is currently the pitching coach for the Arizona Complex League Rockies.

Career
On December 11, 1991, Burba was traded by the Seattle Mariners with Mike Jackson and Bill Swift to the San Francisco Giants for Kevin Mitchell, Mike Remlinger, and minor league prospect Joshua Knox.

His finest season with San Francisco was in 1993. He was 10–3 and posted a 4.23 ERA.

On July 21, 1995, he was traded by the San Francisco Giants with Darren Lewis and Mark Portugal to the Cincinnati Reds for Ricky Pickett, John Roper, Deion Sanders, Scott Service, and David McCarty.

In 1996, Burba was 11–13 and posted an ERA of 3.83. He also hit two home runs as a batter. The next year, he again won 11 games to 10 losses (3 fewer than the previous year) but saw his strikeout numbers drop and his ERA rose by almost a full run (4.73).

Before the start of the 1998 season when he was tabbed as the opening day pitcher for the Reds, the Indians acquired him for prospect Sean Casey, looking for someone to fill the void left by Orel Hershiser. He filled in nicely, going 15–10 in 1998, 15–9 in 1999, and 16–6 in 2000. He battled injuries throughout the 2001 season, and went 10–10 with an ERA of 6.21. That off-season, Burba followed General Manager John Hart to the Texas Rangers. He was later placed on waivers and ended up back in Cleveland to finish the season. After the year. Burba signed a deal with the Milwaukee Brewers.

On September 2, 2004, he was traded by the Milwaukee Brewers to the San Francisco Giants for minor leaguer Josh Habel.

By the 1998 season, his pitching repertoire included the fastball, splitter, slider, curveball, and changeup.

End of career
After filing for free agency from the Giants on October 29, 2004, Dave hooked up with the Houston Astros on a minor league deal on March 29, 2005. He spent the entire season in the minor leagues. He tried again in the 2006 season by signing a minor league deal with the Mariners on January 27, 2006. However, the Mariners released him on March 24, 2006. His final game in the majors was on September 19, 2004.

Coaching career
Burba became pitching coach of the Tri-City Dust Devils for the 2011 season, the class-A team of the Colorado Rockies.
He was also the pitching coach for the Modesto Nuts, Hartford Yard Goats, and Lancaster JetHawks,  in the Rockies farm system. He is currently the pitching coach for the Rockies High Single-A affiliate Boise Hawks in the Northwest League.

References

External links
  
Retrosheet
The Baseball Gauge
Venezuela Winter League

1966 births
Living people
Akron Aeros players
American expatriate baseball players in Canada
Baseball coaches from Ohio
Baseball players from Dayton, Ohio
Bellingham Mariners players
Buffalo Bisons (minor league) players
Calgary Cannons players
Cincinnati Reds players
Cleveland Indians players
Indianapolis Indians players
Leones del Caracas players
American expatriate baseball players in Venezuela
Major League Baseball pitchers
Milwaukee Brewers players
Minor league baseball coaches
Ohio State Buckeyes baseball players
Phoenix Firebirds players
Round Rock Express players
Salinas Spurs players
San Bernardino Spirit players
San Francisco Giants players
Seattle Mariners players
Texas Rangers players
Williamsport Bills players